Orinentomon is a genus of proturans in the family Acerentomidae.

Species
 Orinentomon greenbergi (Nosek, 1980)
 Orinentomon sinensis Yin & Xie, 1993

References

Protura